Cornelis M. van der Walt (born 13 August 1943) is a former boxer. He competed in the men's bantamweight event at the 1964 Summer Olympics, representing Northern Rhodesia. At the 1964 Summer Olympics, he lost to Nicolae Puiu of Romania.

References

External links
 

1943 births
Living people
Northern Rhodesia people
Zambian male boxers
Olympic boxers of Northern Rhodesia
Boxers at the 1964 Summer Olympics
Place of birth missing (living people)
Bantamweight boxers